Whitford Julian VanDusen (July 18, 1889 in Tara, Ontario – December 15, 1978), was a Canadian lumber magnate and philanthropist, who established the Vancouver Foundation.  The VanDusen Botanical Garden in Vancouver was named after him.

References 

1889 births
1978 deaths
Canadian philanthropists
Canadian people of Dutch descent
Canadian business executives
20th-century philanthropists